Grigorov Glacier is the 1.8 km long and 1.3 km wide glacier on the south side of Stavertsi Ridge on Albena Peninsula, Brabant Island in the Palmer Archipelago, Antarctica.  It drains the east slopes of Mount Cabeza and flows southeastwards to enter Hill Bay west of Kostur Point.

The glacier is named after the Bulgarian scientist Stamen Grigorov (1878–1945) who discovered the bacteria Lactobacillus bulgaricus used in the production of yoghurt.

Location

British mapping in 1980.

See also
 List of glaciers in the Antarctic
 Glaciology

Maps
 Antarctic Digital Database (ADD). Scale 1:250000 topographic map of Antarctica. Scientific Committee on Antarctic Research (SCAR). Since 1993, regularly upgraded and updated.
 British Antarctic Territory. Scale 1:200000 topographic map. DOS 610 Series, Sheet W 64 62. Directorate of Overseas Surveys, Tolworth, UK, 1980.
 Brabant Island to Argentine Islands. Scale 1:250000 topographic map. British Antarctic Survey, 2008.

Notes

References
 Bulgarian Antarctic Gazetteer. Antarctic Place-names Commission. (details in Bulgarian, basic data in English)
 Grigorov Glacier. SCAR Composite Antarctic Gazetteer

External links
 Grigorov Glacier. Adjusted Copernix satellite image

Glaciers of the Palmer Archipelago
Bulgaria and the Antarctic
Brabant Island